Bojana Stefanović may refer to:
 Bojana Stefanović (actress)
 Bojana Stefanovic (neuroscientist)